Fred Barnes was an American baseball pitcher in the Negro leagues. He played with the Washington Potomacs in 1924.

References

External links
 and Seamheads 

Washington Potomacs players
Year of birth missing
Year of death missing
Baseball pitchers